The 2013 season was the Arizona Cardinals' 94th in the National Football League, their 26th in Arizona and their first under head coach Bruce Arians. The team finished with a 10–6 record, which was the second time in 37 years that the team finished with at least 10 wins. The Cardinals doubled their win total from 2012, and were in playoff contention heading into the Week 17 regular season finale, but missed the playoffs for a fourth consecutive season.

2013 draft class

Staff

Final roster

Preseason

Schedule

Regular season

Schedule

Note: Intra-division opponents are in bold text.

Game summaries

Week 1: at St. Louis Rams

Week 2: vs. Detroit Lions

Week 3: at New Orleans Saints

Week 4: at Tampa Bay Buccaneers

Week 5: vs. Carolina Panthers

Week 6: at San Francisco 49ers

Week 7: vs. Seattle Seahawks

Week 8: vs. Atlanta Falcons

Week 10: vs. Houston Texans

Week 11: at Jacksonville Jaguars

Week 12: vs. Indianapolis Colts

Week 13: at Philadelphia Eagles

Week 14: vs. St. Louis Rams

Week 15: at Tennessee Titans

With the win, the Cardinals were the only NFC West team to defeat all of their AFC South opponents.

Week 16: at Seattle Seahawks

Week 17: vs. San Francisco 49ers

The Cardinals finished their regular season at home against the San Francisco 49ers in hopes of making the playoffs needing not only a win over the 49ers, but also a long shot upset by the Tampa Bay Buccaneers at New Orleans. After being behind 177 at halftime, the Cardinals were ultimately shut down by their division rivals and put in 3rd place, barely missing out as they needed to beat the 49ers to win the NFC's last playoff spot. However, even if they had won, their spot depended on the outcome of the game between the New Orleans Saints and the Buccaneers. They would finish their season 106, becoming the league's only team with a winning record to not make the playoffs.

Standings

Division

Conference

Footnotes

References

External links

Arizona
Arizona Cardinals seasons
Arizona